Main Avenue Historic District may refer to:

 Main Avenue Historic District (Durango, Colorado), listed on the NRHP in La Plata County, Colorado
 Main Avenue Historic District (De Pere, Wisconsin), listed on the NRHP in Brown County, Wisconsin
 North Main Avenue Historic District, Newton, North Carolina, listed on the NRHP in Catawba County, North Carolina

See also
Main Street Historic District (disambiguation)